Gemerský Jablonec is a village and municipality in the Rimavská Sobota District of the Banská Bystrica Region of southern Slovakia.

History
In historical records, the village was first mentioned in 1275 (Almag). In 1554, it had to pay tributes to the Turks. Until 1918 and between 1938 and 1945 it was part of Hungary.

Genealogical resources
The records for genealogical research are available at the state archive "Statny Archiv in Banska Bystrica, Slovakia"

 Roman Catholic church records (births/marriages/deaths): 1730-1891 (parish B)

See also
 List of municipalities and towns in Slovakia

External links
 Mestská a obecná štatistika SR 
Obec Gemerský Jablonec (Almágy)
Surnames of living people in Gemersky Jablonec

Villages and municipalities in Rimavská Sobota District